Tim Watts may refer to:

Tim Watts (politician) (born 1982), member of the Australia House of Representatives
Tim Watts (filmmaker), British film maker and caricaturist
Timothy Watts, drummer for American heavy metal band Demon Hunter